Muhammad ibn Nafi was a ninth century governor of the Yemen for the Abbasid Caliphate.

Muhammad was appointed to Sana'a by the caliph al-Ma'mun (r. 813–833) in an attempt to conciliate the Yemenis, who had become disorderly under the previous governor Ishaq ibn al-Abbas ibn Muhammad al-Hashimi. Despite this, he was soon faced with the rebellion of one Ahmad ibn Muhammad al-Umari, nicknamed Ahmar al-Ayn (the Red-Eyed One), in the central highlands, and he was eventually driven out of the province by the rebel. During his governorship, al-Jawf was separately administered by the Hamdani chief Malik ibn Luqman al-Arhabi.

Notes

References 
 
 
 

Abbasid governors of Yemen
9th-century people from the Abbasid Caliphate
9th-century Arabs
9th century in Yemen